Lagunas District is one of six districts of the Alto Amazonas Province, in the Department of Loreto, in Peru. It is bordered by the districts of Alto Pastaza, Pastaza, Jeberos, Santa Cruz, Urarinas and Parinari.

The capital, Lagunas, sits on the Huallaga River. The nearest road access is in Yurimaguas, situated 90 km (56 miles) to the south. To reach Yurimaguas by boat takes at least five hours.

History

The settlement of Santiago de Lagunas was established in 1670 by a priest, Juan Lorenzo Lucero.

Human Geography

Lagunas District is home to members of the Kokama and Chayahuita indigenous groups.

Tourism

Lagunas is located 12 km (7.5 miles) from Ranger Station 8 (PV8) of the Pacaya-Samiria National Reserve. It is therefore a starting point to explore the north-western section of the Reserve.

Gallery

References

Districts of the Alto Amazonas Province
Districts of the Loreto Region
1857 establishments in Peru